Holt Heath, in the parish of Holt, is a village near the west bank of the River Severn in Worcestershire.

The nearest towns are all about 6 miles away: to the north Stourport-on-Severn, to the east Droitwich Spa and to the south Worcester.
 
There is a post office in the centre of the village. Outside Holt Heath is a castle and parish church. There are three schools nearby: Grimley and Holt, Great Witley and Hallow.

Holt Heath is also known for its public houses, The Red Lion and The Wharf Inn.

See also
Holt Bridge
Holt Fleet
Grimley, Worcestershire

References

External links 

photos of Holt Heath and surrounding area on geograph

Villages in Worcestershire